The minister of Greyfriars Kirk is a position within the Church of Scotland's Presbytery of Edinburgh. The current minister of Greyfriars Kirk is Richard Frazer, who was admitted in 2003.

Greyfriars originated in 1598, when Robert Rollock and Peter Hewat were appointed ministers of the South West Parish of Edinburgh, then meeting in the Upper Tolbooth portion of St Giles’. The charge of Greyfriars continued with two ministers until 1840, when St John's Church, Victoria Street, was erected and the last minister of the second charge, Thomas Guthrie became the first minister of the new church. New Greyfriars was erected in 1722 and occupied the western half of the kirk. It was a sole charge served by one minister. In 1929, the congregations of Old and New Greyfriars united under one minister. Both churches were burgh churches, meaning that the town council held the right to nominate the churches' ministers.

Since the establishment of the South-West Parish in 1598, 75 ministers have served the congregation: 40 in Old Greyfriars, 30 in New Greyfriars, and five in the united charge. Three ministers of Old Greyfriars were elected moderator of the General Assembly of the Church of Scotland during their incumbencies: George Kay in 1755, William Robertson in 1763, John Inglis in 1804. Two ministers of New Greyfriars were elected to this role during their incumbencies: Robert Henry in 1774 and James Nicoll Ogilvie in 1918. In 2003, Alison Elliot, an elder of Greyfriars, was elected to serve as moderator of the 2004 General Assembly. Elliot was the first woman moderator and the first lay person to hold the office since George Buchanan in 1567. Other notable ministers of Greyfriars include the Covenanters, Robert Douglas, Robert Traill, and Gilbert Rule; the statesman, William Carstares; the philanthropist, Thomas Guthrie; and the liturgical reformer, Robert Lee.

Old Greyfriars
The first congregation of Greyfriars began as the South West Parish of Edinburgh, which met in the Upper Tolbooth portion of St Giles'. In 1620, the congregation moved to the newly-built Greyfriars Kirk. The designation Old Greyfriars was adopted after the erection of New Greyfriars in the western half of the Greyfriars building in 1722.

The congregation was served by two ministers until 1840, when St John's Church on Victoria Street was erected and the minister of the collegiate charge, Thomas Guthrie, became the first minister of the new church. Old Greyfriars was a burgh church of the city of Edinburgh, meaning that, until the abolition of patronage in the Church of Scotland in 1874, the town council held the right to nominate the churches' ministers.

Ministers of the first charge

Ministers of the second charge

New Greyfriars
After an explosion destroyed part of Greyfriars in 1718, the town council decided to rebuild the church to accommodate two congregations. The western half of the church was occupied by New Greyfriars, which opened on 31 December 1722. In its earliest days, the congregation was also known as Wester Greyfriars.

Like Old Greyfriars, New Greyfriars was a burgh church and, prior to the abolition of patronage in the Church of Scotland in 1874, the town council held the right to nominated the minister. Unlike Old Greyfriars, the congregation was a sole charge served by one minister. The town council often appointed promising ministers to the sole charge of New Greyfriars on the understanding that they would be promoted to one of the city’s two-charge churches soon afterwards. For this reason, many ministers of New Greyfriars served relatively short incumbencies.

Greyfriars
After the death of Samuel Dunlop in 1928, no new minister was appointed to Old Greyfriars and the charges of Old and New Greyfriars were united as Greyfriars with William Wallace Dunlop Gardiner, the last minister of New Greyfriars, becoming the first minister of the united congregation. The partition between Old and New Greyfriars was demolished and the church was restored as one sanctuary between 1932 and 1938 under the architect Henry F. Kerr.

Lady Yester's Kirk united with Greyfriars in 1938 and, after Gardiner's departure in 1940, Greyfriars and the New North Church united in 1941; Duncan William Park Strang, the last minister of the New North Church, became minister of Greyfriars.

When Highland, Tolbooth, St John's united with Greyfriars in 1979, Ewen Angus MacLean, the last minister of Highland, Tolbooth, St John's, became minister of the united charge, which adopted the name Greyfriars, Tolbooth, and Highland Kirk. After Greyfriars, Highland, Tolbooth united with Kirk o' Field Parish Church in 2013, the name reverted to "Greyfriars".

References

Notes

Citations

Bibliography

Dunlop, A. Ian (1988). The Kirks of Edinburgh: 1560-1984. Scottish Record Society. 
 Steele, Alan (1993). The Kirk of the Greyfriars, Edinburgh. Society of Friends of the Kirk of the Greyfriars.

External links
 Greyfriars Kirk
 Church of Scotland

Lists of clerics
History of the Church of Scotland
History of Edinburgh
Presbyterianism in Scotland